The 2013 Bayern Rundfahrt was the 34th edition of the Bayern Rundfahrt, an annual cycling road race. Departing from on 22 May, it concluded on 26 May. The stage race was part of the 2013 UCI Europe Tour, and was rated as a 2.HC event.

Stages

Stage 1
22 May 2013 – Pfaffenhofen an der Ilm to Mühldorf,

Stage 2
23 May 2013 – Mühldorf to Viechtach,

Stage 3
24 May 2013 – Viechtach to Kelheim,

Stage 4
25 May 2013 – Schierling,  individual time trial (ITT)

Stage 5
26 May 2013 – Kelheim to Nuremberg,

Classification leadership

General Classification

References

External links

Bayern
Bayern-Rundfahrt
2013 in German sport